Walter D'Souza (1926/1927 – 9 April 2020) was an Indian first-class cricketer who played for Gujarat.

References

Year of birth missing
1920s births
2020 deaths
Gujarat cricketers
Indian cricketers